George Steel may refer to:

George Steel (Manitoba politician) (1858–1940), provincial legislator in Manitoba, Canada
George Steel (musician), music director and conductor in New York City, U.S
George A. Steel (Oregon politician) (1846–1918), politician in Oregon, U.S.
George A. Steel (Michigan politician), State Treasurer of Michigan
George B. Steel (1835–1916), American politician in the Virginia House of Delegates

See also
George Steele (disambiguation)